Virginia's warbler (Leiothlypis virginiae) is a species of New World warbler.

Despite what its name may suggest, Virginia's warbler is not actually named after the American State of Virginia, which makes sense as the birds' typical range only reaches as far east as the state of Texas. The bird's common eastern range is central and southern mountains of Colorado, central Wyoming, and central and western New Mexico. The bird was named for Virginia Anderson, the wife of an army surgeon who discovered the bird at Fort Burgwin, New Mexico, in 1858. When Spencer Fullerton Baird of the Smithsonian Institution fully described the bird for science in 1860 he honored the wishes of the warbler's discoverer and designated Virginia to be both the bird's common and scientific name.

Description
Virginia's warbler is a small bird, only  in length. It is mainly gray in color, with a lighter colored under-belly and a white eye ring. The rump and undertail coverts are yellow. They also have a yellow patch on their breast and a partially hidden dark reddish crest. Females are slightly duller, with less yellow on breast. Virginia's warbler can be easily mistaken for the rare Colima warbler, but it is smaller, has a more yellow rump, and is more widespread. Colima Warbler also lacks yellow breast patch.

Life history
It summers in the south-western United States and will migrate as far south as Belize during the winter, as well as stopping in several Caribbean islands such as the Bahamas, Cuba, and the Turks and Caicos Islands.

Nests are built on the ground, hidden amongst dead leaves and tufts of grass at the base of a shrub or young tree. The nest is cup-shaped and constructed from moss, grass, strips of bark, and roots. The female will lay between three and five eggs, which are white in color and dotted with fine brown speckles. Young are attended to by both sexes, but incubation period and other nesting habits are mostly unknown.

References
 
 Vermivora virginiae, ITIS Report

Further reading

Books
 Olson, C. R., and T. E. Martin. 1999. Virginia’s Warbler (Vermivora virginiae). In The Birds of North America, No. 477 (A. Poole and F. Gill, eds.). The Birds of North America, Inc., Philadelphia, PA.

Thesis
 Conway, Courtney Joseph, Ph.D., (1998) Ecological and physiological constraints on avian incubation behavior and nest-site selection. University of Montana, 149 pages.

Articles
 Berry ME & Bock CE. (1998). Effects of habitat and landscape characteristics on avian breeding distributions in Colorado foothills shrub. Southwestern Naturalist. vol 43, no 4. p. 453-461.
 Howard P. (1999). Virginia's Warbler at Kennesaw Mountain, Cobb County, Georgia. Oriole. vol 64, no 1–2. p. 5-6.
 Martin PR & Martin TE. (2001). Behavioral interactions between coexisting species: Song playback experiments with wood warblers. Ecology. vol 82, no 1. p. 207-218.
 Martin PR & Martin TE. (2001). Ecological and fitness consequences of species coexistence: A removal experiment with wood warblers. Ecology. vol 82, no 1. p. 189-206.
 Sedgwick JA. (1987). Avian Habitat Relationships in Pinyon-Juniper Woodland. Wilson Bulletin. vol 99, no 3. p. 413-431.
 Swanson DL, Palmer JS, Liknes ET & Dean KL. (2000). A breeding population of Virginia's warblers in the southwestern Black Hills of South Dakota. Southwestern Naturalist. vol 45, no 1. p. 39-44.
 Voelker, Gary and Sara L McFarland. (2002) Molt patterns and molting grounds of Lucy's and Virginia's Warblers: Similar yet different. The Wilson Bulletin. Vol 114, no 2. p. 255 (9 pages).

External links

 Virginia's warbler photo gallery VIREO
Vermivora virginiae, Discover Life
Vermivora virginiae, Birds of North America
Vermivora virginiae, Audubon
Vermivora virginiae, Audubon

Leiothlypis
Native birds of the Southwestern United States
Birds of the Great Basin
Virginia's warbler
Virginia's warbler